Admiral (2016 population: 20) is a special service area within the Rural Municipality of Wise Creek No. 77 in Saskatchewan, Canada. Originally incorporated as a village in 1914, it relinquished its status when it dissolved on August 17, 2006.

It is approximately  equidistant from Shaunavon and Ponteix to the west and east respectively. Local services are limited to a post office and Roman Catholic church.

Etymology

Admiral is a CPR list name, named after the naval rank. This is consistent with other communities along the Weyburn-Lethbridge line, including Yeoman, Khedive, Viceroy, and Consul.

Demographics 

Economy 

The economy of the Rural Municipality of Wise Creek No. 77 is predominantly based on agriculture including crop farming and livestock operations.

Infrastructure 
Saskatchewan Transportation Company provided intercity bus service to Admiral prior to its dissolution in 2017.

See also 
 List of communities in Saskatchewan

References 

Designated places in Saskatchewan
Former villages in Saskatchewan
Special service areas in Saskatchewan
Populated places disestablished in 2006
Wise Creek No. 77, Saskatchewan
Division No. 4, Saskatchewan